Cattleya gaskelliana  (translation: Gaskell's Cattley's orchid) is a labiate Cattleya species of orchid.  The diploid chromosome number of C. gaskelliana has been determined as 2n = 40.

References

External links

gaskelliana
gaskelliana
Taxa named by N. E. Brown